Hide and Seek (Swedish: Kurragömma) is a 1963 Swedish comedy film directed by Lars-Magnus Lindgren and starring Jan Malmsjö, Catrin Westerlund and Sven Lindberg. It was shot at the Råsunda Studios in Stockholm with location footage taken in Genoa and Paris. The film's sets were designed by the art director Jan Boleslaw.

Cast
 Jan Malmsjö as 	Peter Flink
 Catrin Westerlund as 	Lenas Holmes
 Sven Lindberg as Jens Polster-Jensen
 Sif Ruud as Lucie
 Ulf Palme as Roger
 Gunnar Sjöberg as 	Felici
 Margit Carlqvist as 	Betty
 Keve Hjelm as 	Sosostro
 Elsa Prawitz as 	Ninon
 Toivo Pawlo as 	Georges
 Ingvar Kjellson as 	Prison Governor
 Tor Isedal as 	Serini
 Björn Gustafson as 	La bête
 Sten Lonnert as 	Alfons
 Åke Harnesk as French Gendarm
 Axel Düberg as 	Mouche
 Liane Linden as 	Roger's secretary
 Christer Abrahamsen as 	Bell boy 
 Carl-Axel Elfving as 	Cutter 
 Peter Lindgren as Intellektuelle Johansson 
 Birger Sahlberg as 	Conference member 
 Hanny Schedin as 	Irate hotel guest 
 Georg Skarstedt as Goldsmith

References

Bibliography 
 Qvist, Per Olov & von Bagh, Peter. Guide to the Cinema of Sweden and Finland. Greenwood Publishing Group, 2000.

External links 
 

1963 films
Swedish comedy films
1963 comedy films
1960s Swedish-language films
Films directed by Lars-Magnus Lindgren
Films set in Stockholm
Films set in Genoa
Films set in Paris
Films shot in Paris
Films shot in Italy
1960s Swedish films